Hsieh Su-wei and Peng Shuai were the defending champions, but Peng decided not to compete this year. Hsieh played alongside Sania Mirza, but lost in the final to Raquel Kops-Jones and Abigail Spears, 4–6, 4–6.

Seeds

Draw

Draw

References 
Main Draw

Qatar Doubles
Qatar Ladies Open
2015 in Qatari sport